William, Will, or Bill Potter may refer to:

People

 Bill Potter (1872–1970), Australian footballer for Fitzroy
 Bill Potter (musician) (1923–1975), American singer, actor, and television personality
 Will Potter, American journalist
 William Potter (cricketer, born 1799) (1799–1853), English cricketer in the 1820s
 William Potter (cricketer, born 1847) (1847–1920), English cricketer
 William Appleton Potter (1842–1909), American architect 
 William C. Potter, professor at the Middlebury Institute of International Studies at Monterey
 William Everett Potter (1905–1988), Governor of the Panama Canal Zone, 1956–1960
 William Knight Potter (1844–1914), businessman and mayor of Providence, Rhode Island
 William Norwood Potter (1840–1895), English chess player and writer
 William P. Potter, (1850–1917), United States Navy officer
 William Simpson Potter (1805–1876), English author
 William W. Potter (Michigan politician) (1869–1940), Michigan politician
 William Wilson Potter (1792–1839), U.S. Representative from Pennsylvania

Fictional characters
 William Potter, a character from the 1962 movie Lawrence of Arabia, played by Harry Fowler

See also
 Potter (surname)